Óscar Martínez or Oscar Martinez may refer to:

Oscar Martínez (actor) (born 1949), Argentine actor
Óscar Martínez (basketball), Paraguayan basketball coach, see Paraguay women's national basketball team
Oscar Martínez (fencer) (born 1889), Argentine Olympic fencer
Óscar Martínez, Spanish footballer, see 1990–91 UE Lleida season
Óscar Martínez (musician) (born 1934), Texan Spanish-language musician
Óscar Martínez (presenter) (born 1976), Spanish TV and radio presenter
Óscar Martínez (tennis) (born 1974), Spanish tennis player
Oscar Martinez (The Office), a character in the American sitcom The Office